Viso may refer to:

E. J. Viso (born 1985), Venezuelan racing driver
Monte Viso, mountain in Italy
El Viso, city in Spain

Computing 
 Virtual ISO, i.e. constructed in memory from a bunch of files on the host for a virtual machine running over it. A VISO is just the recipe describing how to go about this using a syntax vaguely similar to mkisofs and genisoimage.

See also
Vișeu, a river in Romania